The first Argentine Chess Championship was held in 1921. The Champion's title was granted after victorious or drawn match between previous champion and challenger, a winner of Torneo Mayor (this or the next year). The matches were done away in 1950 year, for except 1952 year.

The Argentine Chess Championship is organized by the Argentine Chess Federation.

Matches winners (1921–1953) 
The results of the matches were as follows:

1921/22 Damian Reca – Benito Villegas   5 : 2

1922 Benito Villegas – Lizardo Molina Carranza   6.5 : 1.5  (extra-official match)

1924 Damián Reca – Benito Villegas   5 : 3

1924 Richard Réti (CSR) – Damián Reca   2.5 : 0.5  (non-official match)

1925 Damián Reca – Julio Lynch   5.5 : 2.5  (extra-official match)

1926 Roberto Grau – Damián Reca   5 : 3

1927/28 Damián Reca resigned to play a match for the title.

1929 Roberto Grau – Isaías Pleci  4 : 0

1930 Isaías Pléci – Roberto Grau  5 : 3

1931 Isaías Pléci – Virgilio Fenoglio  6 : 4

1931/32 Jacobo Bolbochán – Isaías Pléci  6 : 3

1932 Jacobo Bolbochán – Isaías Pléci 5.5 : 1.5

1933 Luis Piazzini – Jacobo Bolbochán 5.5 : 2.5

1934/35 Roberto Grau – Luis Piazzini 7.5 : 5.5

1935 Jacobo Bolbochán – Isaías Pléci 2.5 : 0.5  (play-off)

1936 Roberto Grau – Jacobo Bolbochán 5 : 3

1937 Carlos Guimard – Roberto Grau 6 : 2

1938 Carlos Guimard – Luis Piazzini 7.5 : 2.5  (Jacobo Bolbochán resigned)

1939 Roberto Grau – Carlos Guimard 7.5 : 5.5

1939 Triangular 1. Maderna, 2. Piazzini, 3. Gerschman  (play-off)

1940 Carlos Maderna – Luis Piazzini 8 : 6  (Roberto Grau resigned)

1940 Triangular 1. Carlos Guimard, 2. Aristide Gromer (FRA), 3. Franciszek Sulik (POL) (play-off)

1941 Carlos Guimard – Carlos Maderna 8 : 1

1942 Héctor Rossetto – Carlos Guimard 8 : 5  (Rossetto took 3rd place, behind Markas Luckis (LTU) and Hermann Pilnik (GER) in ARG-ch 20th Mayor in 1941)

1942 Hermann Pilnik (former German, then Argentine citizen) won, ahead of Juan Traian Iliesco (ROM)

1943 Juan Iliesco (former Romanian, then Argentine citizen) took 2nd place, behind Gideon Ståhlberg (SWE)

1944 Héctor Rossetto – Juan Iliesco 4.5 : 0.5

1946 Hermann Pilnik – Héctor Rossetto 5 : 3

1948 Julio Bolbochán – Héctor Rossetto 5 : 5

1949 Miguel Najdorf (former Polish, then Argentine citizen) – Julio Bolbochán 5.5 : 4.5

1951 Triangular 1. Carlos Maderna, 2. Jacobo Bolbochán, 3. Enrique Reinhardt  (play-off)

1953 Miguel Najdorf – Rubén Shocrón 4.5 : 0.5

Argentine champions and winners of Challenger's selection tournament (1921–1953) 
{| class="sortable wikitable"
! Year !! Event !! City !! Champion !! Winner of Torneo Mayor 
(Challenger)
|-
| 1921 || match in 1922 || Buenos Aires ||  || Reca and Villegas
|-
| 1922 || extra-official match in 1923|| Buenos Aires ||  || no contest
|-
| 1923 || match in 1924 || Buenos Aires ||  || Reca
|-
| 1924 || without match || Buenos Aires ||  || Richard Réti (off contest)
|-
| 1925 || extra-official match in 1925|| Buenos Aires ||  || no contest 
|-
| 1926 || match in 1926 || Buenos Aires, Rosario, La Plata      ||  || Grau  
|-
| 1927 || without match || Buenos Aires ||  || Reca 
|-
| 1928 || match in 1929 || Buenos Aires ||  || Pleci
|-
| 1929 || match in 1930 || Buenos Aires ||  || Pleci
|-
| 1930 || match in 1931 || Buenos Aires ||  || Virgilio Fenoglio
|-
| 1931 || match in 1931/1932 || Buenos Aires ||  || Jac. Bolbochan 
|-
| 1932 || match in 1932 || Buenos Aires ||  || Pleci
|-
| 1933 || match in 1933 || Buenos Aires ||  || Piazzini
|-
| 1934 || match in 1935 || Buenos Aires ||  || Grau
|-
| 1935 || match in 1936 || Buenos Aires ||  || Jac. Bolbochán, Pleci
|-
| 1936 || match in 1937 || Buenos Aires, Santa Fe ||  || Guimard 
|-
| 1937 || match in 1938 || Buenos Aires, Necochea ||  || Jac. Bolbochán 
|-
| 1938 || match in 1939 || La Plata ||  || Grau 
|-
| 1939 || match in 1940 || Buenos Aires ||  || Juan Traian Iliesco (off contest)  
|-
| 1940 || match in 1941 || Buenos Aires, La Plata ||  || Guimard 
|-
| 1941 || match in 1942 || 9 de Julio, Buenos Aires ||  || Markas Luckis (off contest)
|-
| 1942 || without match  || Buenos Aires ||  || Pilnik
|-
| 1943 || without match  ||Buenos Aires ||  || Gideon Ståhlberg (off contest)
|-
| 1944 || match in 1944 || Nueve de Julio ||  || Rossetto 
|-
| 1945 || match in 1946 || Bahía Blanca ||  || Pilnik 
|-
| 1946 || without match || Buenos Aires ||  || Jul. Bolbochán 
|-
| 1947 || without match || Buenos Aires ||  || Rossetto 
|-
| 1948 || match in 1948 || Buenos Aires ||  || Jul. Bolbochán 
|-
| 1949 || match in 1949 || Buenos Aires ||  || Najdorf 
|}

Men's tournaments winners (1950- ) 

{| class="sortable wikitable"
! Year !! Event !! City !! Champion !! Winner of Torneo Mayor 
(Challenger)
|-
| 1950 || tournament  play-off in 1951 || Buenos Aires ||  || Maderna,  Jac. Bolbochán,   
Enrique Reinhardt 
|-
| 1951 || tournament || Buenos Aires ||  || Najdorf 
|-
| 1952 || match in 1953 || Buenos Aires ||  || Ruben Shocron 
|-
| 1953 || tournament || Buenos Aires ||  || 
|-
| 1955 || tournament || Buenos Aires ||  || 
|-
| 1956 || tournament || Buenos Aires ||  || 
|-
| 1957 || tournament || Buenos Aires ||  || 
|-
| 1958 || tournament || Buenos Aires ||  || 
|-
| 1959 || tournament || Buenos Aires ||  || 
|-
| 1960 || tournament || Buenos Aires ||  || 
|-
| 1961 || tournament || Buenos Aires ||  || 
|-
| 1962 || tournament || Buenos Aires ||  || 
|-
| 1963 || tournament || Buenos Aires ||  ||Garcia, Samuel Schweber and Klein
|-
| 1964 || tournament || Buenos Aires ||  || 
|-
| 1965 || tournament || Buenos Aires ||  || 
|-
| 1966 || tournament || Buenos Aires ||  || 
|-
| 1967 || tournament || Mar del Plata ||  || 
|-
| 1968 || tournament || Buenos Aires ||  || Sanguineti and Schweber
|-
| 1969 || tournament || Buenos Aires ||  || Juarez and Garcia 
|-
| 1971 || tournament || Buenos Aires ||  || 
|-
| 1972 || tournament || Buenos Aires ||  || 
|-
| 1973 || tournament || Santa Fe ||  || Sanguineti and Debarnot
|-
| 1974 || tournament || Caseros      ||  || 
|-
| 1975 || tournament || Buenos Aires ||  || Najdorf and Panno
|-
| 1976 || tournament || Buenos Aires ||  || 
|-
| 1978 || tournament || Buenos Aires ||  || Emma and Campora 
|-
| 1980 || tournament || Quilmes      ||  || 
|-
| 1982 || tournament || Buenos Aires ||  || Rubinetti, Hase, Baillo, 
Bronstein and Campora
|-
| 1983 || tournament || Buenos Aires ||  || Baillo and Tempone
|-
| 1984 || tournament || Buenos Aires ||  || 
|-
| 1985 || tournament || Buenos Aires ||  || 
|-
| 1986 || tournament ||                  ||  || 
|-
| 1987 || tournament ||                  ||  || 
|-
| 1988 || tournament ||                  ||  || 
|-
| 1989 || tournament ||                  ||  || 
|-
| 1990 || tournament ||                  ||  || Soppe and Tempone
|-
| 1991 || tournament ||                  ||  || 
|-
| 1992 ||  tournament ||                 ||  || 
|-
| 1993 ||  tournament ||                 ||  || 
|-
| 1994 ||  tournament ||                 ||  || 
|-
| 1995 ||  tournament ||                 ||  || 
|-
| 1996 ||  tournament ||                 ||  || 
|-
| 1997 ||   tournament ||                ||  || 
|-
| 1998 ||  tournament ||                 ||  || 
|-
| 1999 ||  tournament ||                 ||  || 
|-
| 2000 ||  tournament ||                 ||  || 
|-
| 2001 ||  tournament ||                 ||  || Felgaer and Peralta 
|-
| 2002 ||  tournament ||                 ||  || Labollita and Slipak
|-
| 2003 ||  tournament ||                 ||  || 
|-
| 2004 ||  tournament ||                 ||  || 
|-
| 2005 ||  tournament ||                 ||  || Flores and Ricardi 
|-
| 2006 ||  tournament ||                 || Fernando Peralta || 
|-
| 2007 ||  tournament ||                 ||    || 
|-
| 2008 ||  tournament || Mendoza     ||    || 
|-
| 2009 ||  tournament || La Plata ||  || 
|-
| 2010 ||  tournament || Buenos Aires ||  || 
|-
| 2011 ||  tournament || La Plata ||  ||
|-
| 2012 ||  tournament || Villa Martelli ||  || 
|-
| 2013 ||  tournament || Saenz Pena ||  || 
|-
| 2014 ||  tournament || Saenz Pena ||  ||
|-
| 2015 ||  tournament || Buenos Aires ||  ||
|-
| 2016 ||  tournament || Villa Martelli ||  ||
|-
| 2017 ||  tournament || Ramos Mejia ||  ||
|-
| 2018 ||  tournament || Laprida || Fernando Peralta  ||
|-
| 2019 ||  tournament || Buenos Aires ||  ||
|-
| 2020 ||  tournament ||      ||      ||
|-
| 2021 ||  tournament ||      ||   Federico Pérez Ponsa ||
|-
| 2022 ||  tournament || Leonardo Tristan ||
|}

Women

{| class="sortable wikitable"
! Year !! City !! Champion
|-
|| 1938 || || Dora Trepat de Navarro
|-
|| 1939 || ||Dora Trepat de Navarro
|-
|| 1940 || ||Dora Trepat de Navarro
|-
|| 1941 || ||Dora Trepat de Navarro
|-
|| 1942 || ||Dora Trepat de Navarro
|-
|| 1948 || || Paulette Schwartzmann
|-
|| 1949 || ||Paulette Schwartzmann
|-
|| 1950 || ||Paulette Schwartzmann
|-
|| 1951 || || María Angélica Berea de Montero
|-
|| 1952 || ||Paulette Schwartzmann
|-
|| 1953 || || Celia Baudot de Moschini
|-
|| 1954 || || Soledad Gonzalez de Huguet
|-
|| 1955 || ||Odile Heilbronner
|-
|| 1956 || ||Soledad Gonzalez de Huguet
|-
|| 1957 || ||Celia Baudot de Moschini
|-
|| 1958 || ||Celia Baudot de Moschini
|-
|| 1959 || ||Dora Trepat de Navarro
|-
|| 1960 || ||Dora Trepat de Navarro
|-
|| 1961 || || Aida Karguer
|-
|| 1962 || ||Celia Baudot de Moschini
|-
|| 1963 || ||Celia Baudot de Moschini
|-
|| 1964 || ||Dora Trepat de Navarro
|-
|| 1965 || ||Aida Karguer
|-
|| 1968 || ||Celia Baudot de Moschini
|-
|| 1969 || ||Aida Karguer
|-
|| 1971 || ||Aida Karguer
|-
|| 1974 || || Julia Arias
|-
|| 1975 || ||Julia Arias
|-
|| 1976 || ||Julia Arias
|-
|| 1977 || ||Julia Arias
|-
|| 1978 || || Virginia Justo
|-
|| 1979 || || Edith Soppe
|-
|| 1980 || ||Edith Soppe
|-
|| 1981 || ||Edith Soppe
|-
|| 1982 || ||Virginia Justo
|-
|| 1983 || ||Virginia Justo
|-
|| 1984 || ||Virginia Justo
|-
|| 1985 || || Claudia Amura
|-
|| 1986 || || Liliana Burijovich
|-
|| 1987 || ||Claudia Amura
|-
|| 1988 || ||Claudia Amura
|-
|| 1989 || ||Claudia Amura
|-
|| 1990 || ||Liliana Burijovich
|-
|| 1991 || ||Liliana Burijovich
|-
|| 1993 || || Sandra Villegas
|-
|| 1994 || ||Sandra Villegas
|-
|| 1995 || || Elisa Maggiolo
|-
|| 1996 || ||Sandra Villegas
|-
|| 1998 || ||Elisa Maggiolo
|-
|| 1999 || ||Liliana Burijovich
|-
|| 2000 || Buenos Aires || Carolina Luján
|-
|| 2001 || ||Carolina Luján
|-
|| 2002 || Esperanza || Anahí Meza
|-
|| 2003 || Carlos Paz ||Liliana Burijovich
|-
|| 2004 || ||Carolina Luján
|-
|| 2005 || Sierra de la Ventana || Marisa Zuriel
|-
|| 2006 || Villa Martelli ||Carolina Luján
|-
|| 2007 ||Buenos Aires||María de los Angeles Plazaola
|-
|| 2008 ||Buenos Aires||María de los Angeles Plazaola
|-
|| 2009 || Puan || María Florencia Fernández
|-
|| 2010 ||Buenos Aires||María de los Angeles Plazaola
|-
|| 2011 ||Buenos Aires||Ayelén Martínez
|-
|| 2012 ||Villa Martelli||Marisa Zuriel
|-
|| 2013 || Estancia Grande ||María Florencia Fernández
|-
|| 2014 ||Villa Martelli||Claudia Amura
|-
|| 2015 ||Buenos Aires||Carolina Luján
|-
|| 2016 ||Villa Martelli||Ayelén Martínez
|-
|| 2017 ||Buenos Aires||María Florencia Fernández
|-
|| 2018 ||Ushuaia||María Florencia Fernández
|}

Notes

References

 

http://reports.chessdom.com/news-2009/argentina-chess-championship
http://www.allyearchess.com

Chess national championships
Women's chess national championships
Championship
1921 in chess
Recurring sporting events established in 1921
Chess